Termitomyces tylerianus is a species of agaric fungus in the family Lyophyllaceae. Found in Africa and China, it was first formally described in 1964. Fruit bodies (mushrooms) grow in groups or clusters near termite nests in deciduous forests. The mushrooms are edible.

References

Edible fungi
Fungi described in 1964
Fungi of Africa
Fungi of Asia
Lyophyllaceae